Ikeja Cantonment is a large Nigerian Armed Forces installation in the northern part of Lagos. It is situated north of the city centre near the districts of Isolo and Onigbongo.

During the 1966 Nigerian counter-coup of July 28-29, 1966, Lt. Col.  M. O. Nzefili said there was a reported massacre at the camp.

It became the home of 9 Brigade of the 81 Division of the Nigerian Army.

In January 2002, the camp was being used to store a large quantity of "high calibre bombs", as well as other sundry explosives. On the afternoon of 27 January, a fire broke out in a street market being held next to the base, which was also home to the families of soldiers. At around 18:00 the fire apparently spread to the base's main munitions store, causing the 2002 Lagos armoury explosion.

References 

https://naijaquest.com/list-of-army-barracks-in-nigeria/ - list of barracks in Nigeria

Barracks in Nigeria
Lagos